Grozden is a village in Sungurlare Municipality, in Burgas Province, in southeastern Bulgaria.

Honours
Grozden Peak on Fallières Coast, Antarctica is named after the village.

References

Villages in Burgas Province